Mönchaltorf is a municipality in the district of Uster in the canton of Zürich in Switzerland.

History 
Mönchaltorf is first mentioned in 741  as Villa Altorf.  In 872 it was mentioned as Altorf monachorum. It also holds the record for the longest Apfel Strudel.

Geography

Of this area, 70.1% is used for agricultural purposes, while 11.2% is forested. Of the rest of the land, 15.7% is settled (buildings or roads) and the remainder (3%) is non-productive (rivers, glaciers or mountains).   housing and buildings made up 12.1% of the total area, while transportation infrastructure made up the rest (3.7%). Of the total unproductive area, water (streams and lakes) made up 0.3% of the area.   12.8% of the total municipal area was undergoing some type of construction.

Demographics
, 11.6% of the population was made up of foreign nationals.   the gender distribution of the population was 48.8% male and 51.2% female. Over the last 10 years the population has grown at a rate of 3.7%. Most of the population speaks German  (92.3%), with Italian being second most common ( 1.7%) and French being third ( 1.0%).

In the 2007 election the most popular party was the SVP which received 39.2% of the vote.  The next three most popular parties were the SPS (20.9%), the CSP (11.9%) and the FDP (11.7%).

The age distribution of the population is children and teenagers (0–19 years old) make up 23.6% of the population, while adults (20–64 years old) make up 66.7% and seniors (over 64 years old) make up 9.8%.  In Mönchaltorf about 83.9% of the population (between age 25-64) have completed either non-mandatory upper secondary education or additional higher education (either university or a Fachhochschule).  There are 1336 households in Mönchaltorf.

Mönchaltorf has an unemployment rate of 1.87%.  , there were 110 people employed in the primary economic sector and about 36 businesses involved in this sector.  367 people are employed in the secondary sector and there are 37 businesses in this sector.  602 people are employed in the tertiary sector, with 119 businesses in this sector.   50% of the working population were employed full-time, and 50% were employed part-time.

 there were 733 Catholics and 1582 Protestants in Mönchaltorf. In the 2000 census, religion was broken down into several smaller categories. Of the rest of the population, 0% were Muslim, 3.2% belonged to another religion (not listed), 2.7% did not give a religion, and 13.4% were atheist or agnostic.

Population growth
The following table shows the population development of Möchaltorf.

Politics 

Mayor is Annemarie Beglinger-Vögeli (FDP). Former mayors were Gustav Stehli (SVP), Felix Hess (SVP) and until 2006 Ruedi Lerch (FDP).

Gallery

References

External links 

 Offizielle Website der Gemeinde Mönchaltorf 
 Statistische Daten des Kantons zur Gemeinde Mönchaltorf 

 Gemeinde Mönchaltorf im GIS des Kantons Zürich 

Municipalities of the canton of Zürich